Toronto Metro can refer to:
Toronto subway, rapid transit system
Metropolitan Toronto, a defunct level of government